Mount Steadman is a rural locality in the North Burnett Region, Queensland, Australia. In the  Mount Steadman had a population of 8 people.

Geography 
The Perry Fault, a major regional strike-slip structure in south east Queensland is in the New England Orogenic Belt.  Mount Steadman is located along the Perry Fault.  

The locality is roughly bounded by the Bin Bin Range to the north-east and south-east, Taylors Road to the south-west, and Gayndah Mount Perry Road to the north-west.

Mount Steadman Road enters the locality from the south (Gooroolba) and exits to the north (Mingo).

The land use is grazing on native vegetation.

History 
The Mount Steadman Intrusion Related Gold System (IRGS) has been intermittently explored since 1888.  The most recent was the Mt Steadman project covering . 

Mount Steadman Provisional School opened circa 1894 and closed circa 1895. Mount Steadman State School opened on 4 May 1920 and closed circa 1952.

In the  Mount Steadman had a population of 8 people.

Economy 
There are a number of homesteads in the locality, including:

 High Park
 Morven
 Perry View/ Didcot
 Strathmore

Education 
There are no schools in Mount Steadman. The nearest primary school is Coalstoun Lakes State School in Coalstoun Lakes to the south-east. The nearest secondary schools are Biggenden State School (to Year 10) in Biggenden to the east and Burnett State College (to Year 12) in Gayndah to the south-west.

References 

North Burnett Region
Localities in Queensland